Pudakalakatti is a village in Dharwad district of Karnataka, India.

Demographics 
As of the 2011 Census of India there were 516 households in Pudakalakatti and a total population of 2,578 consisting of 1,286 males and 1,292 females. There were 332 children ages 0-6.

References

Villages in Dharwad district